Sir Joseph Gurney Braithwaite, 1st Baronet (24 May 1895 – 25 June 1958) was an English Conservative Party politician.

Gurney Braithwaite came from a Quaker family, the youngest son of Joseph Bevan Braithwaite (stockbroker). He was educated at Downs School, Colwall and Bootham School
, York. During World War I, he served in the Royal Navy at the Suvla Bay landing, Gallipoli, and in Palestine. He became a stockbroker and company director.

Braithwaite contested Rotherhithe without success in 1929, and was elected the member of parliament (MP) for Sheffield Hillsborough at the 1931 general election, losing the seat in 1935 to the previous incumbent, A. V. Alexander. He re-entered Parliament in a 1939 by-election for Holderness. In Parliament, he was active on issues relating to ex-servicemen and the Navy, and was himself a lieutenant-commander in the RNVR. During World War II he helped organise convoys in the Thames area.

At the 1950 general election, Braithwaite's Holderness seat was abolished and he was elected for the marginal Bristol North West constituency. He served as Parliamentary Secretary to the Minister of Transport in the government of Winston Churchill from 1951 to 1953. He was made a baronet on 28 January 1954. Boundary changes involved his seat being redrawn to Labour's advantage, and at the 1955 general election Braithwaite lost. He died three years later, aged 63.

References

External links 
 

1895 births
1958 deaths
Baronets in the Baronetage of the United Kingdom
Conservative Party (UK) MPs for English constituencies
Ministers in the third Churchill government, 1951–1955
People educated at Bootham School
People educated at The Downs School, Herefordshire
Royal Naval Volunteer Reserve personnel of World War II
Royal Navy officers
UK MPs 1931–1935
UK MPs 1935–1945
UK MPs 1945–1950
UK MPs 1950–1951
UK MPs 1951–1955